Karaoke is a form of entertainment in which an amateur singer or singers sing along with recorded music.

Karaoke may also refer to:

 Karaoke (album), by Swedish musician Magnus Uggla
 Karaoke (TV series), a British drama written by Dennis Potter
 Karaoke (1999 Canadian film), a Canadian film directed by Stéphane Lafleur
 Karaoke (1999 Japanese film), a Japanese film directed by Shirō Sano
 Karaoke (2009 film), a Malaysian film directed by Chris Chong Chan Fui
 "Karaoke", a song by Big Freedia from the 2018 album 3rd Ward Bounce
 "Karaoke", a song by T-Pain from the 2008 album Three Ringz

See also

 
 Cairokee, an Egyptian rock band
 Karaoke box, also called KTV, karaoke television, karaoke TV
 Karaoke Television
 KTV (disambiguation)